Bogić is a Serbo-Croatian male given name and surname, predominantly borne by ethnic Serbs, derived from the word bog meaning "god". It may refer to:

Given name
 Bogić Bogićević, Bosnian politician
 Bogić Bogićević (1955–2017), Serbian football coach
 Bogić Risimović (1926–1986), Yugoslav-Serbian painter
 Bogić Vujošević (born 1992) Serbian–Austrian basketball player

Surname
 Đorđe Bogić (1911–1941), murder victim and Serbian Orthodox saint
 Nikola Bogić (born 1981), Serbian footballer

See also
 Bogović, surname
 Bogovčić, surname
 Bogojević, surname
 Božić, surname
 Bogići, toponym
 Bogićevica, mountain in Kosovo
 Bogićevići, village in Montenegro

Serbian surnames
Theophoric names